Richard K. Erwin (July 11, 1860 – October 5, 1917) was a justice of the Indiana Supreme Court from January 6, 1913, to October 5, 1917.

Born in Adams County, Indiana, to pioneers who had settled the area, Erwin served in the Indiana House of Representatives and was an Adams county prosecutor and a circuit court judge before being elected to the Indiana Supreme Court in 1910. He served until his death, following four weeks of hospitalization after surgery to remove gallstones.

References

Justices of the Indiana Supreme Court
1860 births
1917 deaths
People from Adams County, Indiana
Members of the Indiana House of Representatives
19th-century American judges